Red and White Plum Blossoms is an early 18th-century painting on a pair of two-panel byōbu folding screens by Japanese artist Ogata Kōrin (1658–1716).  The simple, stylized composition depicts a patterned flowing river with a white plum tree on the left and a red one on the right. The plum blossoms indicate the scene occurs in spring.

The work is one of the best-known paintings in Japan, where it is a registered National Treasure.  It resides in the MOA Museum of Art in the city of Atami in Shizuoka Prefecture.

Description

The simple, stylized composition of Red and White Plum Blossoms depicts a patterned flowing river with a white plum tree on the left and a red plum tree on the right.  The plum blossoms indicate the scene occurs in spring.

The work is undated, but believed to be from Ogata's later period, and probably one of his final works.  Based on evidence such as the signature, technique, and composition, art historian  dates the work to 1714 or 1715, just before the artist's death.  The seal Hōshuku appears on both screens, but each has a different signature: Hokkyō Kōrin on the left and Sei Sei Kōrin on the right, the latter a signature he began to use after he left Edo, which he visited between 1704 and 1709.

It is in coloured pigments on paper placed on a pair of two-panel byōbu folding screens.  Each screen measures .  Kōrin achieved the mottling texture on the trees using tarashikomi, a technique in which the painter applies a second layer of pigment or ink before the first layer has dried.  The work is considered exemplary of the Rinpa school that Kōrin cofounded.

Square lattice patterns throughout the composition have led to the assumption the painting was made with a lower layer of silver and gold leaf.  The lower layers of the painting have a gold colour that was assumed to have been achieved with gold leaf. XRF analysis has shown only organic pigments mixed with a small amount of gold.  The black in the painting has been assumed to be either silver leaf that has blackened from exposure to sulphur, or blue pigment that has blackened as the azurite in the pigment has come off.  Again, XRF imaging has found only organic dyes.  Analysis of the trees has been inconclusive, but found that they were painted with pigments likely made with the minerals cinnabar and calcite, as well as organic pigments elsewhere, such as in the buds.

Provenance

No documentation exists from before the 20th century on the commission or provenance of the screens.  They receive mention in no Edo-period publications on Kōrin's works and were not copied by his followers, which suggests they were not well known.  A journal article in 1907 is the first known publication about them, and their first public display came in a 200th-anniversary exhibition of Kōrin's work in 1915.

Mokichi Okada began negotiations to purchase the screens in 1953 with the descendants of the daimyōs of the Tsugaru clan, who may have been the original owners; the transfer was concluded in 1954.  The screens reside at the MOA Museum of Art in the city of Atami in Shizuoka Prefecture, along with the rest of Okada's collection.  The museum displays the screens a month per year in late winter, the season when the plum blossoms bloom.  Nearby is a garden reproduction of the screens' subject: two hillocks dotted with 360 plum trees, the number of plum trees said to surround the shrine of Lin Bu, a Chinese poet renowned for writing about plum blossoms.  The display attracts large crowds.

Legacy

The screens are considered one of Kōrin's greatest works and are amongst the best known works of Japanese art.

The NHK historical drama  used a computer animated version of Red and White Plum Blossoms during its opening credits.

Notes

References

Works cited

 
 
 
 

Japanese paintings
National Treasures of Japan
Byōbu
Rinpa school
Water in art